William J. Jimeno (born November 26, 1967) is a Colombian-American author and retired Port Authority of New York and New Jersey Police Department officer who survived the September 11 attacks in 2001. He was buried under the rubble for a total of 18 hours, but survived, along with fellow Port Authority officer John McLoughlin. He has written two books regarding the experience.

Jimeno was born in 1967 in Colombia but immigrated to New York City as a boy with his family.

Career
At the time of the attacks, he was a rookie cop assigned to the Port Authority Bus Terminal.  He saw the shadow of American Airlines Flight 11, the airplane that seconds later hit the North Tower of the World Trade Center. He rode to the WTC site with 20 other Port Authority police officers in a commandeered bus.

The collapse of the South Tower trapped Jimeno and two other Port Authority officers, led by Sgt. McLoughlin, under the Concourse between the twin towers.  Only Jimeno and McLoughlin survived.  Dominick Pezzulo survived the initial collapse but was killed by the collapse of the North Tower while he was trying to free Jimeno.

A USA Today account observed:

The two men were located and extricated after former U.S. Marines Sergeant Jason Thomas and Staff Sergeant Dave Karnes heard their cries for help. Both survivors, especially McLoughlin, were severely injured.  They required several surgeries and months of hospitalization for recovery and rehabilitation. On June 11, 2002, McLoughlin (with a walker) and Jimeno (with a limp) walked across a stage at Madison Square Garden to receive the Port Authority's Medal of Honor.

Books

Jimeno is the author of two books, including one for children, regarding the events of 9/11.

Media

The entrapment and rescue were portrayed in the 2006 Oliver Stone film World Trade Center, with Jimeno portrayed by Michael Peña.

On January 2, 2008, Jimeno appeared on the television game show Deal or No Deal and won $271,000.

References

1967 births
Living people
American police officers
Port Authority of New York and New Jersey Police Department
Survivors of the September 11 attacks
Colombian emigrants to the United States
American people of Colombian descent
People from Barranquilla
People from New York City